Georg Hellmesberger Sr. (24 April 1800 – 16 August 1873) was an Austrian violinist, conductor, and composer.

He was born in Vienna. His first music lesson was by his father. He went to school at the Cistercian Heiligenkreuz Abbey. He attended both philosophy courses in Vienna. He studied at the Vienna Conservatory under Joseph Böhm (violin) and Emanuel Förster (composition). In 1821 he became Böhm's assistant. He taught at the Conservatory from 1826. From 1833 to 1867 he was professor. Among his students were Joseph Joachim, Leopold Auer, and his two sons.

He was concertmaster of the Vienna Court Opera from 1830 after the death of Ignaz Schuppanzigh and a member of the court orchestra (Hofmusikkapelle). He was Kapellmeister of the Vienna Philharmonic Orchestra from 1842 until he became pensioner at 1867.

He composed two violin concertos, string quartets, variations solo violin works.

He was the father of Joseph Hellmesberger Sr. and Georg Hellmesberger Jr.

References

External links

 
 
 

1800 births
1873 deaths
19th-century Austrian people
19th-century classical violinists
Male classical violinists
19th-century conductors (music)
19th-century composers
Austrian conductors (music)
Male conductors (music)
Austrian violinists
Concertmasters
Concertmasters of the Vienna Philharmonic
Austrian male composers
Austrian composers
University of Music and Performing Arts Vienna alumni
Hellmesberger family
Musicians from Vienna